The Great Gatsby is a 1949 American drama film directed by Elliott Nugent, and produced by Richard Maibaum, from a screenplay by Richard Maibaum and Cyril Hume. It is based on the 1925 novel The Great Gatsby by F. Scott Fitzgerald. The music score was by Robert Emmett Dolan, and the cinematography by John F. Seitz. The production was designed by Roland Anderson and Hans Dreier, and the costumes by Edith Head.

The film stars Alan Ladd, Betty Field, Macdonald Carey, Ruth Hussey, and Barry Sullivan, and features Shelley Winters and Howard Da Silva, the latter of whom later appeared in the 1974 version.

Plot
A mysterious figure, Jay Gatsby, who throws lavish parties at his Long Island Sound estate, asks neighbor Nick Carraway to arrange a private tea with Nick's cousin, Daisy Buchanan. It turns out Gatsby loved her before going off to war.

Now a wealthy man, Gatsby wants her back, but Daisy is married to Tom Buchanan and has a daughter. She is unhappy, however, and is aware her husband has been having an affair with Myrtle Wilson, wife of an owner of a gas station.

Daisy seems to welcome Gatsby's attentions. They socialize with her friend, Jordan Baker, and Nick in the city. Daisy drives off with Gatsby, taking the wheel of the car, and hits Myrtle in the street, killing her. Wilson believes at first that his wife deliberately was killed by Tom, but Gatsby takes the blame for the accident. He is shot by Wilson while in the pool of his mansion, and only Jordan and Nick attend his funeral.

Cast

Production
This was the second film adaptation of the novel, after the now-lost 1926 silent version.

Producer Richard Maibaum had worked with Alan Ladd on O.S.S. and the two men became friends. Maibaum reflected upon the events leading up the production in 1986:
I never saw another actor who moved as gracefully as Alan [Ladd], who had that kind of coordination. A beautiful, deep voice. Everybody said he was a non-actor but they were wrong. He knew what he was doing. He was overly modest, shy, an introvert. But once you won his confidence you could do no wrong. Paramount had Alan Ladd pegged as a dubious actor, but I didn't believe them. I was in his house and he took me up to the second floor, where he had a wardrobe about as long as this room. He opened it up and there must have been hundreds of suits, sport jackets, slacks and suits. He looked at me and said, "Not bad for an Okie kid, eh?" I got goose pimples because I remembered when Gatsby took Daisy to show her his mansion, he also showed her his wardrobe and said, "I've got a man in England who buys me clothes. He sends over a selection of things at the beginning of each season, spring and fall." I said to myself, "My God, he is the Great Gatsby!" And he was in a way the Great Gatsby. Success had settled on him as it had on Gatsby. Being a movie star, he had the same kind of aura of success, but he didn't know how to handle it. He had the same precise, careful speech, the controlled manner, the carefully modulated voice.
Paramount owned film rights to the novel. Maibaum showed it to Ladd and his wife Sue and says "they liked it; they were a little dubious, but I talked them into it." Maibaum later said they liked it in part "because it would be a change of pace for him from the usual action stuff, and an opportunity to prove he was more of an actor than Hollywood thought."

Paramount were reluctant to make the film with Ladd — Fitzgerald's reputation was not as strong in 1946 as it was later — but Maibaum and Ladd persisted. Plans to make the film were announced in 1946, with the script to be written by Maibaum and Cyril Hume. However, it was pushed back a number of years, reportedly due to censorship concerns.

Maibaum eventually got around the censorship issues by adding a scene at the beginning of the script where Nick and Jordan quote from Proverbs that "There is a way which seemeth right unto a man, but the end thereof are the ways of death." Maibaum said in 1986 that this appeased the censor because it provided the "voice of morality... I had to do it, which I now think was all wrong and very un-Fitzgerald-like. To moralise like that was something he never did; he was always indirect. It was the price I paid to get the film done." The project was officially re-activated in October 1947.

Maibaum says that even when Joseph Breen and the censors approved the script, Paramount kept delaying production. "They used the script as a carrot to make Alan do several other films, each time promising that his next would be Gatsby", wrote the producer. "Finally after two long years of this he rebelled and threatened to go on suspension. That did it."

The original director was John Farrow, who had made a number of films with Ladd, and The Big Clock with Maibaum. However, Maibaum says that he and the director disagreed over the casting of Daisy:
We were agreed that the character... was a beautiful, glamorous, unstable girl. Farrow however placed more importance on the glamour and beauty than I did. Hollywood was full of beautiful girls. I wanted more, an actress who could handle what has been called 'the disharmonic chatter of the '20s', the authentic sound of the feckless, disillusioned lost generation... What we needed was a fine actress who could make believable the obsessive love she evoked from him"Farrow wanted Gene Tierney, but Maibaum pushed for Betty Field. Studio production head Henry Ginsberg gave final say to Maibaum, and Farrow quit the film as a result. Farrow was replaced as director by Eliot Nugent. Maibaum says that Nugent was enthusiastic about casting Betty Field and, although he had reservations about Ladd, he kept these opinions from Maibaum. Maibaum later said Nugent was "a bit indecisive" during the film, and subsequently discovered the director was suffering a mental illness at the time.

Maibaum says the shoot went smoothly apart, from one moment when Ladd refused to kiss Field. Ladd said that many of his fans were children and that he did not want to play a character who kissed a married woman. Maibaum tried to argue him out of it but failed. However, Ladd's Gatsby does kiss Field's Daisy on screen in one scene in the final film.

Censorship
Although the film was first envisioned in the early 1940s, Production Code Administration head Joseph Breen refused to greenlight the film for many years. After Breen's retirement, his successor Eric Johnston was likewise wary to approve the film. "The Johnston office seems to be afraid of starting a new jazz cycle", Maibaum told the press in 1946. Due to such censorship, film critics noted that the final film contained very little of "the flavor of the Prohibition era".  Bosley Crowther of The New York Times lamented that "the period of the Nineteen Twenties is briefly and inadequately sketched with a jumble of gay Long Island parties, old clothes, old songs and old cars. The baneful influence of prohibition and the disillusionment of post-World War I" were conspicuously absent despite the Jazz Age setting.

Reception
According to Maibaum the film "did well financially although reviews were mixed. Critics differed as much as John Farrow and myself about Betty Field's Daisy. Some thought she was perfect, others that she was subtly wrong. Alan, for the most part, received surprisingly good personal notices. My own satisfaction stemmed from what Charles Brackett of sainted memory to all screenwriters said to me: 'You've personally started an F. Scott Fitzgerald revival'."

The New York Times''' contemporary review dismissed the film as "a limp, sentimental romance, involving a bootlegger and an old sweetheart, based on Scott Fitzgerald's classic story, but lacking the novel's bite." According to Variety, the film ranked 45th among popular movies in the U.S. and Canada in 1949.

Restoration
In 2012, a new print of the 1949 film was produced.

References

Maibaum, Richard. Backstory: Interviews with Screenwriters of Hollywood's Golden Age, 1986

External links
 

Review of film at Variety''

Films based on The Great Gatsby
1949 films
1949 drama films
American drama films
American black-and-white films
Films directed by Elliott Nugent
Films scored by Robert Emmett Dolan
Films shot in Los Angeles
Films with screenplays by Richard Maibaum
Paramount Pictures films
Films with screenplays by Cyril Hume
1940s English-language films
1940s American films